The 2004 NCAA Women's Gymnastics Championship was held in April 2004 and involved 12 schools competing for the national championship of women's NCAA Division I gymnastics.  It was the twenty third NCAA gymnastics national championship. The defending NCAA Team Champion for 2003 was UCLA.  The competition took place in Los Angeles, California hosted by the UCLA in Pauley Pavilion. The 2004 team championship was won by defending champion UCLA and the individual champion was Jeana Rice of Alabama, 39.650.

2004 UCLA Championship Roster
The 2004 UCLA women's gymnastics team is considered one of the best teams in NCAA gymnastics history, which was led by 7-time National Champion head coach Valorie Kondos Field.

UCLA was ranked preseason #1 for the fourth consecutive year and team members had collectively won seven NCAA individual championships, earned 27 All-America honors and made 13 World Championships and five Olympic appearances. The team returned five All-Americans and had talent throughout the depth of their lineup down to the "dynamic freshmen talent."

Seniors
 Jeanette Antolin
 Jamie Dantzscher
 Christy Erickson
 Kristen Maloney
 Trishna Patel
 Yvonne Tousek
 Jamie Williams

Juniors
 Kisha Auld
 Christie Tedmon

Sophomores
 Kate Richardson
 Holly Murdock
 Jennifer Sutton

Freshmen
 Ashley Martin
 Ashley Peckett
 Michelle Selesky (Michelle Giuda)
 Aimee Walker (Aimee Walker Pond)
 Courtney Walker
 Lori Winn

Team Results

Session 1

Session 2

Super Six

References

External links
 NCAA Gymnastics Championship Official site

NCAA Women's Gymnastics championship
NCAA Women's Gymnastics Championship